They Call Me Mister Tibbs! is a 1970 American DeLuxe Color crime drama film directed by Gordon Douglas. The second installment in a trilogy, the release was preceded by In the Heat of the Night (1967) and followed by The Organization (1971). The film's title was taken from a line in the first film.

Sidney Poitier reprised his role of police detective Virgil Tibbs, though in this sequel, Tibbs is working for the San Francisco Police rather than the Philadelphia Police (as in the original film) or the Pasadena Police (as in the novels).

Plot
Detective Virgil Tibbs, now a lieutenant with the San Francisco police, is assigned to investigate the murder of a prostitute. A prime suspect is Reverend Logan Sharpe, a street preacher who is leading one of the sides in a city referendum on an urban renewal project. He tells Tibbs he was visiting the prostitute in his professional capacity, to advise her spiritually, and that when he left her apartment, she was alive and healthy.

Tibbs tracks down and questions the janitor from the victim's building, Mealie Williamson, and Woody Garfield, a shady character who owns the building and might have been the dead woman's pimp, who sent the janitor into hiding. Later, suspicion falls on a hood named Rice Weedon, who is pursued and shot by Tibbs in self-defense.

Tibbs’ ongoing investigation leads him to conclude that Sharpe really is the murderer. When confronted, Sharpe confesses; however, he requests that Tibbs not arrest him for 24 hours, until the polls close on the city referendum. When Tibbs refuses, Sharpe, while being taken away to be arrested, purposely steps in front of a moving vehicle and is killed.

Cast

Production
Quincy Jones wrote the score, as he did with In the Heat of the Night, although the tone of the music in both is markedly different. The previous film, owing to its setting, had a country and bluesy sound, whereas his work for this film was in the funk milieu that would become Jones' trademark in the early 1970s. 
  
The film's title was taken from Virgil's assertive response in In the Heat of the Night after the chief mockingly asked him what people call him in the city where he works.

It was followed by a third film titled The Organization (1971).

The film was the last appearance of veteran actor Juano Hernández, who died in July 1970, a few days after the film premiered.

Reception

The film has a 60% rating on Rotten Tomatoes as of June 2009. It did not attract nearly as positive a response as the series' 1967 debut, In the Heat of the Night, which won five Academy Awards including the 1967 Best Picture Oscar.

Musical score and soundtrack

The film score was composed, arranged and conducted by Quincy Jones, and the soundtrack album was released on the United Artists label in 1970.

Allmusic's Steven McDonald said "They Call Me Mister Tibbs! had a more open, urban attitude from its San Francisco setting. The music throughout has an edge, with some interesting musical experiments going on ... Jones, as one example, used cimbalom to reflect Tibbs' feelings".

Track listing
All compositions by Quincy Jones
 "Call Me Mister Tibbs (Main Title)" − 4:33
 "'Rev' Logan (Organ Solo)" − 2:12
 "Blues for Mister Tibbs" − 6:27
 "Fat Poppadaddy" − 3:28
 "Soul Flower" − 4:20
 "Call Me Mister Tibbs (Main Title)" − 2:15
 "Black Cherry" − 2:15
 "Family Man" − 1:20
 "Side Pocket" − 2:05
 "Why, Daddy?" − 3:08
 "Call Me Mister Tibbs (End Title)" − 0:46

Personnel
Unidentified orchestra arranged and conducted by Quincy Jones including
Carol Kaye - electric bass
Chuck Findley - trumpet
Emil Richards - percussion

See also
List of American films of 1970

References

External links

1970 films
1970s crime thriller films
American crime thriller films
American mystery films
American sequel films
Blaxploitation films
Films scored by Quincy Jones
Films directed by Gordon Douglas
Films set in San Francisco
Films set in the San Francisco Bay Area
Films shot in San Francisco
American police detective films
Virgil Tibbs
United Artists films
African-American films
1970s English-language films
1970s American films